The Diocese of St. Augustine is a Latin Church ecclesiastical territory of the Catholic Church, located in the U.S. state of Florida. It is a suffragan diocese in the Ecclesiastical Province of Miami, covering much of North Florida, including the cities of St. Augustine, Jacksonville, and Gainesville. The bishop's seat is the Cathedral Basilica of St. Augustine; the current bishop is Erik T. Pohlmeier.

St. Augustine is the oldest continuously inhabited European-established settlement in the continental United States. The city was part of other dioceses until March 11, 1870, when the Diocese of St. Augustine was created. It covered most of the Florida peninsula until the 1950s, when Florida's expanding population necessitated the creation of new dioceses.

History

Background 
The history of the diocese dates to the beginnings of European settlement in North America, when Pedro Menéndez de Avilés secured Spanish supremacy in Florida by defeating the French and planting a permanent colony, Nombre de Dios Mission, in 1565 to evangelize the Indians. He had been accompanied by four priests, and there they celebrated the first Mass in what would become the United States.

Martin Francisco Lopez de Mendoza Grajales became first the parish priest of St. Augustine, the first established parish in the United States. Pending the arrival of regular missionaries, Menéndez appointed soldiers he deemed qualified to give religious instructions to the Indians.

St. Augustine began its existence as a regularly constituted parish of the Diocese of Santiago de Cuba. Its church records, dating from 1594, are preserved in the archives of the present cathedral. In 1793, Pius VI established the Diocese of Louisiana and the Floridas, appointing the Right Rev. Luis Peñalver y Cardenas, with residence at New Orleans, as first bishop. After Bishop Peñalver's promotion to the Archbishopric of Guatemala in 1801, no successor having been appointed, Louisiana, which was annexed to the United States in 1803, came under the jurisdiction of Bishop John Carroll of Baltimore in 1806, the bishops of Havana reassuming authority over Florida until the appointment of Fr Michael Portier in 1825 to the new Vicariate of Alabama and Florida. 

Bishop Portier undertook single-handed the work of his vast vicariate, not having a single priest, until at his request, Bishop John England of Charleston sent Father Edward Mayne to St. Augustine in 1828.

Formation of diocese 
In 1850, the Diocese of Savannah was created and included that part of Florida which lies east of the Apalachicola River; this was constituted a separate vicariate in 1857 under Bishop Augustin Verot as vicar apostolic, and erected into the Diocese of St. Augustine in 1870, with Bishop Verot—who had headed the Diocese of Savannah since 1861—as first bishop. 

Bishop Verot's unwearied activity and zeal in promoting religion and education soon bore fruit; schools were opened by the Christian Brothers and the Sisters of Mercy in 1858, but the outbreak of the Civil War frustrated all hopes of success. In 1866, the Sisters of St. Joseph were introduced from France, and despite the most adverse conditions, they had several flourishing schools and academies in operation before many years. 

The era of progress inaugurated by Bishop Verot continued under the administration of Bishop John Moore (1877–1901), whose successor, the Right Rev. William John Kenny, was consecrated by Cardinal Gibbons 18 May 1902, in the historic Cathedral of St. Augustine.

Modern era

Sex abuse

In March 2020, the Diocese of St. Augustine removed former Gainesville Father John H. Dux from ministry after determining that sex abuse allegations against him from 1976, which were now well beyond the state of Florida statute of limitation for a criminal case, were credible. In November 2020, the state of Florida released a list of 97 Catholic priests who were "credibly accused" of committing sex abuse, with five accused of committing sex abuse while serving in the Diocese of St. Augustine. However, a total of 13 priests on this statewide list were tied to the Diocese of St. Augustine.

Bishops

Bishops of Saint Augustine
The list of ordinaries of the diocese and their years of service:
 Augustin Verot, P.S.S. (1870–1876)
 John Moore (1877–1901)
 William John Kenny (1902–1913)
 Michael Joseph Curley (1914–1921), appointed Archbishop of Baltimore-Washington
 Patrick Joseph Barry (1922–1940)
 Joseph Patrick Hurley (1940–1967), Archbishop (personal title) in 1949
 Paul Francis Tanner (1968–1979)
 John J. Snyder (1979–2000)
 Victor Galeone (2001–2011)
 Felipe de Jesús Estévez (2011–2022)
 Erik T. Pohlmeier (2022-present)

Auxiliary Bishop
Thomas Joseph McDonough (1947-1957), appointed Auxiliary Bishop of Savannah and later Bishop of Savannah and Archbishop of Louisville

Other priests of this diocese who became bishops
Maurice Patrick Foley, appointed Bishop of Tuguegarao in the Philippines in 1910
William Turner, appointed Bishop of Buffalo in 1919
John Joseph Fitzpatrick (priest here, 1948-1958), appointed Auxiliary Bishop of Miami in 1968 and later Bishop of Brownsville
William Thomas Larkin, appointed Bishop of Saint Petersburg in 1979
Joseph Keith Symons, appointed Auxiliary Bishop of Saint Petersburg in 1981
Robert Joseph Baker, appointed Bishop of Charleston in 1999 and later Bishop of Birmingham
Thanh Thai Nguyen, appointed Auxiliary Bishop of Orange in 2017

High schools
 Bishop John J. Snyder High School, Jacksonville
 Bishop Kenny High School, Jacksonville
 St. Francis High School, Gainesville
 St. Joseph Academy, St. Augustine

Elementary schools

St. Michael Academy (PreK-8), Fernandina Beach
Annunciation (PreK-8), Middleburg
Blessed Trinity (PreK-8), Jacksonville
Cathedral Parish (K-8), St. Augustine
Christ the King (PreK-8), Jacksonville
Epiphany (K-8), Lake City
Holy Family  (PreK-8), Jacksonville
Holy Spirit  (PreK-8), Jacksonville
Morning Star (Ungraded), Jacksonville
Palmer Academy (PreK-8), Ponte Vedra Beach
Queen of Peace  (PreK-8), Gainesville
St Elizabeth Ann Seton (PreK-8), Palm Coast
San Jose Catholic (PreK-8), Jacksonville, 
San Juan del Rio (PreK-8), Saint Johns
Sacred Heart (PreK-8)
St. Paul's, Jacksonville Beach 
St. Paul's Riverside (3 years old - 8th grade), Jacksonville 
St. Matthew's (Prek- 8), Jacksonville
Holy Rosary, Jacksonville,
St. Pius, Jacksonville
Resurrection, Jacksonville
St. Patrick's (PreK-8), Gainesville

Parishes
There are 53 active parishes in the Diocese of St. Augustine.

Basilicas
Basilica of the Immaculate Conception - Pope Francis raised Immaculate Conception in Jacksonville to a Minor Basilica in 2013.
Cathedral Basilica of St. Augustine (St. Augustine, Florida) - Originally established in 1565 and re-built in the 18th century, it is the oldest church in Florida.

Coat of Arms

See also

 Catholic Church by country
 Catholic Church hierarchy
 List of the Catholic dioceses of the United States

References

External links
Roman Catholic Diocese of St. Augustine Official Site

Christianity in Jacksonville, Florida
Saint Augustine
Saint Augustin
Saint Augustin
 
St. Augustine, Florida
1870 establishments in Florida